Thiès is a region of western Senegal. The capital is also called Thiès.

Geography
Thiès has two coastlines, one in the north with the Grande Côte housing the Niayes vegetable market, one to the south with the Petite Côte, one of the tourist areas of Senegal.
 
Principally the main passageway between the peninsula and the rest of the country, the region of Thiès has received a communication route connected to the first rail line and new road infrastructure.
 
Thiès is relatively small, yet it is the most populous region after Dakar, with a population of 2,709,112 inhabitants at the end 2007.

The coastal communities are dependent on fishing, growing crops, and coastal tourism for subsistence. The interior of the region was the peanut basin. Phosphates are also mined there.

History

The Thiès Region has always been occupied by the Serer people since the ancient Serers and their ancestors. However, in the pre-colonial period, more so around the 16th century, the Wolof immigrants among others have settled in. Like the Fatick Region, the entire Thiès Region is strongly Serer and one of the most important of Serer country. It is also where many of the Serer sacred and historical sites are found. The area is well represented by the Cangin, a sub-group of the Serers, who had a fierce reputation for protecting their country from outsiders in precolonial times as well as during the colonial-era (see Timeline of Serer history and Serer medieval history).

Geographically, the region partially overlaps with the precolonial Kingdoms of Cayor and Baol. The Kingdom of Baol was ruled by the Joof family for several centuries until c 1549. During the colonial-era, its development was supported by the railway line - the Dakar-Saint-Louis railway in the late nineteenth century, and then with the Dakar-Niger railway. Thus Administratively, it is one of the oldest in the country.

Administrative divisions
Thiès region is divided into 3 departments (départements), 14 communes (soon 15 communes in 2023), 12 arrondissements, 32 communautés rurales and 3 communes d'arrondissement.

Departments
The region is divided into 3 departments as follows':
M'bour Département
Thiès Département
Tivaoune Département

Communes
In M'bour Département:
Ville d'Akon (planned)
M'bour
Joal-Fadiouth
Nguekokh
Ngaparou
Popenguine-Ndayane
Saly
Somone
Thiadiaye

In Thiès Département:
Kayar
Khombole
Pout

In Tivaouane Département:
Tivaouane
Mboro
Meckhe

Arrondissements
In M'bour Département:
Fissel
Séssène
Sindia

In Thiès Département:
Thiès Nord (also commune d'arrondissement)
Thiès Sud (divided into 2 communes d'arrondissement)
Keur Moussa
Notto
Thiénaba

In Tivaouane Département:
Méouane
Médina Dakhar
Niakhène
Pambal

Communautés rurales

In M'bour Département:
Fissel
Ndiaganiao
Nguéniène
Sandiara
Séssène 
Malicounda
Diass
Sindia

In Thiès Département:
Diender Geudj
Fandène 
Keur Moussa 
Notto
Tassette
Ndiayène Sirah
Thiénaba
Ngoudiane
Touba Toul

In Tivaouane Département:
Méouane
Taïba Ndiaye
Darou-Khoudoss
Koul
Mérina Dakhar
Pékesse 
Nbayène
Ngandiouf
Niakhène
Thilmakha
Chérif Lo
Mont Rolland
Notto Gouye Diama
Pambal
Pire Gourèye

In 2003, the rural population was 769,884, grouped in 31 villages, in communautés rurales.

References

External links
List of administrative divisions in Senegal
Map of Thies region
Site on Thiès

 
Regions of Senegal